Felix Mendelssohn's Piano Quartet No. 1 in C minor, Op. 1 (MWV Q 11), for piano, violin, viola and cello was completed on 18 October 1822 and dedicated to Polish Prince Antoni Radziwiłł.  Mendelssohn's three numbered piano quartets were the first works of his to be published, hence their opus numbers.

Structure 
The work has four movements:

 Allegro vivace (C minor)
 Adagio (A-flat major)
 Scherzo: Presto (C minor)
 Allegro moderato (C minor)

A typical performance lasts just under half an hour.

External links 
 

Chamber music by Felix Mendelssohn
Mendelssohn 1
1822 compositions
Compositions in C minor